Royal justices were an innovation in the law reforms of the Angevin kings of England. Royal justices were roving officials of the king, sent to seek out notorious robbers and murderers and bring them to justice.

The first important step dates from the twelfth century, when royal justice was established with the effective power to define and defend the civil rights of the individual-such as they then were--on the basis, not of local custom, but of the common law of the land.

(Page 11).

See also 
 Justice in Eyre
 Assize of Clarendon

References